Allan Thomson may refer to:

 Allan Thomson (rugby league) (1943–2006), Australian rugby league footballer
 Allan Thomson (businessman) (1788–1884), banker, railroad executive, and city councilman of Wilmington, Delaware
 Allan Thomson (geologist) (1881–1928), New Zealand geologist, scientific administrator and museum director

See also
Alan Thomson (disambiguation)
Alan Thompson (disambiguation)